United Nations Security Council Resolution 494, adopted on 11 December 1981, having considered the question of the recommendation for the appointment of the Secretary-General of the United Nations, the council recommended to the General Assembly the Mr. Javier Pérez de Cuéllar be appointed for a five-year term from 1 January 1982, to 31 December 1986.

The resolution was adopted unanimously by the council.

See also
 List of United Nations Security Council Resolutions 401 to 500 (1976–1982)
 United Nations Security Council Resolution 589

References
Text of the Resolution at undocs.org

External links
 

 0494
 0494
December 1981 events